Haji Aijaz Hussain, popularly known as Haji Kallan (b 1886–??) was an Indian businessman and philanthropist. He was born in Moradabad, North-Western Provinces on 21 April 1886. He was the first exporter of brass handicrafts from Moradabad. Due to his popularity many place have been named after him in the city of Moradabad, like Gali Haji Kallan (street), the Adam and Eve Mission Hospital is better known as Haji Kallan Hospital and numerous smaller landmarks.
He was the second son of Nadir Hussain and the grandson of Sheikh Elahie Bux (brother of Sheikh Hussein Bux).

References

1886 births
Year of death missing
Businesspeople from Uttar Pradesh